Atlético Madrid Voleibol also known as ATM Voleibol was a Spanish men's volleyball club from Madrid and it was competing in the Spanish Superliga.

History
The club was founded in 1966, then dissolved by 1984.

Honours

Superliga : 5
 1969, 1970, 1971, 1974, 1975
Copa del Rey : 5
 1970, 1971, 1972, 1974, 1975

Seasons results

References

External links
  

Volleyball
Sports teams in Madrid
Spanish volleyball clubs
Volleyball clubs established in 1966
1966 establishments in Spain